Montville High School may be:
Montville High School (Connecticut) in Montville, Connecticut
Montville Township High School in Montville, New Jersey